"Green Mars" is a science fiction novella by the American writer Kim Stanley Robinson, first published in Asimov's Science Fiction in September 1985, eight years before his novel of the same name.

The author later said that he wrote the story "mainly to stake a claim – at least a moral claim – on the name. I thought Green Mars was such a good name, such an obvious name." The story describes an expedition climbing Olympus Mons on Mars. It is set in a different fictional universe from that of the novelit has characters which also appear in the author's short works "Exploring Fossil Canyon" (1982) and "A Martian Romance" (1999).

At the time the story was written, the most recent missions to Mars were Viking 1 and Viking 2 which  reached the planet in the summer of 1976.

Plot summary
The story, set on a terraformed Mars, describes, using the present tense, an expedition climbing Olympus Mons, "the tallest mountain in the solar system". It is seen from the viewpoint of Roger Clayborne, who has recently resigned after twenty-seven years as Minister of the Interior at Government House in Burroughs. He feels his political career has been futile. He thinks the planet could have been left as it was found, not turned into another Earth and made a laboratory for new animals and plants.

All but one of the group were born on Mars. The expedition leader is Eileen Monday. People can live for several hundred years, and she and Clayborne are both now about three hundred; she has forgotten their relationship, when they were in their twenties, but Clayborne, who has an unusually complete memory, can recall it. He talks to her of his regrets about the planet; she says his efforts with the Red Mars party would never have succeeded.

The details of mountaineering are described as the group ascends. Members take oxygen on the upper part of the ascent, and strong winds develop. During the climb, one person suffers a broken arm because of a falling rock, and is taken down by a few others; another suffers pulmonary edema because of ascending too rapidly, and is taken to a lower camp to ascend more slowly.

On the flank of the volcano, where they are above the atmosphere, they wear suits and helmets. By the end of the journey, Clayborne and Eileen Monday's relationship has revived, and he feels persuaded by her view of the planet.

Reception
"Green Mars" was placed third in the Locus Award for Best Novella in 1986. It was nominated for the Nebula Award for Best Novella, and it was nominated for the Hugo Award for Best Novella in that year.

References

1985 short stories
Novels set on Mars
Terraforming
Works originally published in Asimov's Science Fiction
Mountaineering books